Trevor Campbell (born 24 July 1954) is a Jamaican sprinter. He competed in the men's 4 × 400 metres relay at the 1972 Summer Olympics. He won a silver medal in the 4 x 400 metres relay at the 1971 Pan American Games.

References

1954 births
Living people
Athletes (track and field) at the 1972 Summer Olympics
Jamaican male sprinters
Olympic athletes of Jamaica
Pan American Games silver medalists for Jamaica
Pan American Games medalists in athletics (track and field)
Athletes (track and field) at the 1971 Pan American Games
Athletes (track and field) at the 1975 Pan American Games
Commonwealth Games competitors for Jamaica
Athletes (track and field) at the 1974 British Commonwealth Games
Place of birth missing (living people)
Medalists at the 1971 Pan American Games